Margaret Frere (12 August 1863 – 14 March 1961) was a British school manager and welfare worker who established the model for a school care service that was adopted throughout London's elementary schools.

Life
Frere was born in the part of London's west end known as Bloomsbury. Her parents were Adelaide Ellen (born Rowe) and Bartle John Laurie Frere who was a solicitor.

She was a school manager of a poor school in the area of London known as Seven Dials. She had realised in 1898 that handing out missing goods like dinners, clothing, and boots did not benefit poor children as afterwards they remained under fed and badly clothed. She and another manager visited the homes of the children who were receiving help. She realised that unless the parents were visited, and assisted too, then there was no permanent improvement. Her school was recognised as one of the best for welfare amongst similar poor schools.

In 1909 she published a small handbook "Children's Care Committees: How to Work Them in Public Elementary Schools" which she aimed at women school managers to help them with their "social and charitable work as distinct from their official work."

Before war broke out London decided to create a school care service that would be modelled on her "Charitable Funds Committee". Frere had come to believe that a care service should "unite the home with the school education". The new school care service relied on volunteers but they were initially organised by two women employed by London City Council and Helen Nussey was one of them. Theodora Morton was their boss and head of the new service. Morton divided the service into twelve regions where care committees staffed by volunteers identified children in need of school dinners or other assistance.

In 1939 when war broke out there was 158 employed staff and 5,000 volunteers servicing every elementary school in London. And every school had a "care committee" like the "Charitable Funds Committee" Frere had created forty years before.

Frere was proud of the school care service that grew from "an acorn" she had planted. She was not able to attend the celebrations and the jubilee service in 1958 but she sent a letter. She died in Sawbridgeworth in 1961.

References

1863 births
1961 deaths
People from Bloomsbury
British social workers
Heads of schools in London